Glenade Lough, locally known as Glenade Lake, is a freshwater lake in the northwest of Ireland. It is located in north County Leitrim in the Glenade Valley.

Geography
Glenade Lough is situated between the Dartry Mountains to the west and the Arroo Mountain range to the east.

Hydrology
Glenade Lough is fed by a number of streams entering at the lake's northern end. The lake drains south into the Bonet River.

Natural history
Fish species in Glenade Lough include roach, perch, pike and the critically endangered European eel. The lake is also home to the white-clawed crayfish, another endangered species. Glenade Lough and its immediate surroundings were designated a Special Area of Conservation in 1997.

Ecology
The water quality was reported to be satisfactory  with a mesotrophic rating.  The ecology of Glenade Lough, and other Leitrim waterways, is threatened by curly waterweed, zebra mussel, and freshwater clam invasive species.

Legend
Glenade Lough is a site for the legendary beast (or cryptid) the Dobhar-chú, a very large otter-like creature believed to inhabit the lake. A gravestone in a nearby cemetery commemorates the alleged killing of a local woman by a dobhar-chú in 1722.

See also
List of loughs in Ireland

References and notes

Notes

Primary sources

Secondary sources

Lakes of County Leitrim